Coleophora graminicolella is a moth of the family Coleophoridae. It is found in Europe. It has been recorded from Andorra, Italy, Hungary, Bulgaria, Romania, Croatia, Czech Republic, Slovakia, Slovenia, Poland, Switzerland, the Netherlands, Germany, Denmark, Fennoscandia, Estonia, Latvia, Lithuania, southern Russia and the Near East.

The wingspan is 15–17 mm.

External links
Fauna Europaea

graminicolella
Moths described in 1876
Moths of Asia
Moths of Europe